The following teams took part in the Division III tournament. This group played in Mexico City, Mexico, between January 9 to 18, 2011. The two teams with the best records, Mexico and Serbia, were promoted to Division II for the 2012 World Junior Ice Hockey Championships.

Table

Results
All times local (CST/UTC−6)

Statistics

Top 10 scorers

Goaltending leaders 
(minimum 40% team's total ice time)

References

External links 
 IIHF.com

III
World Junior Ice Hockey Championships – Division III
International ice hockey competitions hosted by Mexico
Outdoor ice hockey games